The Economical Printing Press is the second commercial printing press to be established in Dubai and has been in Dubai for over 40 Years. The Economical Printing Press is specialized in ABT and BLTmedia.

History

The company was founded by Mr. "Hassan Fahmi" Saleh AlShunnar, an architectural engineer who migrated to Dubai in the early 60's looking for work.

The Economical Printing Press was forced to downsize its employee count in 2009 due to the great recession that hit Dubai in that period, which saw many people leaving the country with all their belonging and debt unsettled.

The company has relocated its headquarters to Al Quoz in Dubai, and is about to open five more branches scattered around the United Arab Emirates.

References

Companies based in Dubai